Grand Forks station is a train station in western Grand Forks, North Dakota. It is served by Amtrak's Empire Builder line.

It is located at a railroad wye where Amtrak trains headed for Chicago turn south.  The station was built in a standard design by Amtrak in 1982, replacing the use of a Great Northern station downtown and allowing Amtrak to serve the city without having to go downtown and then back up.  For a while before the station officially opened, trains stopped here and passengers were bussed to and from the old station. The former Great Northern freight station has been listed on the National Register of Historic Places since 1990.

Grand Forks is served by Amtrak's daily Empire Builder. Of the seven North Dakota stations served by Amtrak, Grand Forks was the fourth busiest in FY10, boarding or detraining an average of about 55 passengers daily.  The station is owned by Amtrak.  The platform and tracks are owned by BNSF Railway.

Between late 2000 and November 2021, Amtrak completed a project to make the Grand Forks station compliant with the Americans with Disabilities Act of 1990.

While there is no public transit service directly serving the station as of 2022, Cities Area Transit has a bus stop located at University Avenue and North 51st Street, approximately half a mile to the northeast.

Gallery

Station layout

References

External links 

Grand Forks Amtrak Station (USA Rail Guide -- Train Web)

Amtrak stations in North Dakota
Railway stations in the United States opened in 1982
Buildings and structures in Grand Forks, North Dakota
Transportation in Grand Forks County, North Dakota
1982 establishments in North Dakota